Zalaegerszegi Torna Egylet Football Club, commonly known as Zalaegerszegi TE, Zalaegerszeg or ZTE, is a football club from the city of Zalaegerszeg in Hungary. Zalaegerszeg has won one Hungarian League title in 2002.

History
ZTE traces its roots back to 1912, at the time of the Austro-Hungarian Empire. Its first match was a 4–2 defeat to a team from Vasvár.  The team was first composed of members of a literary and debating society.  ZTE flourished under coach József Vadász, but World War I halted its progress.  In 1920, Zalaegerszegi TE, or "Gymanistics Club of Zalaegerszeg," was born.  They were defeated in their debut match, losing 2–1 to AK Szombathely on August 21, 1920, but were motivated by a crowd of over 2,000 fans.

ZTE's league history began in 1924, when they joined the Hungarian second division.  The club won the title a decade later and entered the top flight in 1934.  However, the start of World War II under the regime of Admiral Miklós Horthy saw ZTE's field and equipment confiscated.  After the war, in 1957, ZTE merged with two other local teams, signalling the rebirth of the club.

1990s
From then on to the 1990s, however, ZTE did not really challenge the Hungarian title much.  The league was dominated by Budapest club Ferencvárosi TC.  In 1994, ZTE managed to gain a solid foothold on the Hungarian first division.

2000s

In the 2000s, the club reached their zenith by winning the Hungarian League for the first time in the club history. In the 2001–02 season, Zalaegrszeg finished second in the first stage of the championship gaining 61 points while Budapest rivals MTK Budapest FC 64 points. In the championship play-off Zalaegerszeg secured their first ever league title and finished on 71 points and Péter Bozsik's team overtook Budapest rivals Ferencváros and MTK Budapest along the way. Krisztián Kenesei and Gábor Egressy were the key figures of the title-winning team by scoring 37 goals. In the 2002–03 season, Zalaegerszeg finished in the bottom half of the table and competed in the relegation play-offs. In the following seasons, ZTE would consolidate in the lower half of the table, finishing in 9th, 6th and 11th place respectively.

In the 2002–03 UEFA Champions League qualifying phase Zalaegerszeg defeated Croatian champions NK Zagreb on away goals. The first match was played in Zalaegerszeg and the club won it by 1–0. The only goal was scored by Darko Ljubojević. In the second leg Zagreb was winning by 2–0 when in the 87th minute Zalaegerszeg was awarded a penalty which was scored by Flórián Urbán. ZTE beat Zagreb on away goals. In the third qualifying round Zalaegerszeg faced English giants Manchester United. In the first leg, ZTE provided a stunning shock by winning 1–0 with a last minute goal from Béla Koplárovics. However, in the return leg at Old Trafford, Man United won a convincing 5–0 victory. Ruud van Nistelrooy scored in the 5th minute and in the 75th minute then David Beckham, Paul Scholes, Ole Gunnar Solskjær scored. The English side progressed to the first group stage with a 5–1 aggregate victory.
In the 2006–07 season after nine rounds Zalaegerszeg was on the top of the league table. At the end of the season the club finished third securing a place in the European competitions of the Intertoto Cup 2007. In the spring of 2009 János Csank was appointed as the coach of the club. The success coach has already won two Hunagrian League titles. In 1994 with Vác and in 2001 with Ferencváros.

2010s
In the 2010–11 season Zalaegerszeg was competing for the Europa League position with Budapest rivals Ferencváros but ZTE finished fourth and could not secure a place for the qualifiers. In the 2011–12 season Zalaegerszeg started the season with five consecutive defeats which resulted the dismissal of János Csank. He was replaced by former Ferencváros coach László Prukner. The first half of the 2011–12 Hungarian League season was a nightmare for the club since they finished last gaining only 6 points without any victories. On April 21, 2012 Zalaegerszeg were relegated to the second division of the Hungarian League after the defeat against titleholders Videoton.

On 15 May 2014, former Zalaegerszeg player Gergely Kocsárdi was elected as director of the club. It was also announced that the company called Pharos '95 gained more than 50% of the shares of the club for about 16 million HUF.

By winning the 2018–19 Nemzeti Bajnokság II season, Zalaegerszeg were promoted to the 2019–20 Nemzeti Bajnokság I season. Zalaegerszeg could win 25 matches, drew seven times and lost only 6 matches in the season. The most prolific goal scorer of the season was Gergely Bobál by scoring 17 goals.

2020s
Before the 2020-21 Nemzeti Bajnokság I season it was rumoured that former PSV Eindhoven and Hungary national football team star Balázs Dzsudzsák would be signed by the club. However, Gábor Végh, the owner of the club, claimed that the club had not started any negotiations with Dzsudzsák.

In the 2021–22 Nemzeti Bajnokság I season, Zalaegerszeg finished 8th. One of the most spectacular victories of the season was when Zalaegerszeg beat Ferencváros 2-1 at the Groupama Aréna on 16 October 2021. However, on the negative side, Zalaegerszeg lost to Gyirmót 2-1 at home on 8 May 2022.

Crest and colours 

The colours of the club are  blue and  white.

Manufacturers and shirt sponsors
The following table shows in detail Zalaegerszegi TE kit manufacturers and shirt sponsors by year:

Stadiums and facilities 
Zalaegerszeg play their matches in the ZTE Arena. The stadium is able to host 14000 people. Due to the increased attention Zalaegerszeg played their 2002–03 UEFA Champions League match against Manchester United at the Ferenc Puskás Stadium.

Honours
Nemzeti Bajnokság I
Champions: 2001–02
Nemzeti Bajnokság II
Winners: 2018–19
Magyar Kupa
Runners-up: 2009–10
Szuperkupa
Runners-up: 2002

Players

Current squad

Out on loan

Players with multiple nationalities
 Bojan Sanković
 Attila Mocsi

Non-playing staff
Head coach: Ricardo Moniz

U-12 U17 coach: William Gallas

Seasons

European cup history

European record
As of August 14, 2010

Head coach 
 Péter Bozsik (2001–2003)
 Imre Gellei (July 2003 – June 2006)
 László Dajka (July 2005 – December 2005)
 Lázár Szentes (December 2005 – May 2006)
 Antal Simon (May 2006 – April 2007)
 Tamás Nagy (April 2007 – June 2007)
 Attila Supka (July 2008 – October 2008)
 János Csank (October 2008 – August 2011)
 László Prukner (September 2011 – June 2012)
 Sándor Preisinger (July 2012 – March 2013)
 Antal Simon (March 2013 – September 2013)
 Miklós Lendvai (September 2013 – June 2014)
 Emil Lőrincz (June 2014 – November 2014)
 Miklós Lendvai (November 2014 – June 2015)
 János Csank (June 2015 – 2017)
 Tamás Artner (2017–2018)
 Tamás Nagy (2018)
 Barna Dobos (2018–10.02.2020)
 Gábor Márton (10.02.2020– July 2020)
 Gábor Boér (July 2020– March 2021)
 Róbert Waltner (March 2021–25 March 2022)
 Balázs Molnár (interim)
 Ricardo Moniz (25 May 2022-)

See also
List of Zalaegerszegi TE players

References

External links

Official website 
Unofficial website 
Soccerway profile

 
Sport in Zalaegerszeg
Football clubs in Hungary
Association football clubs established in 1920
1920 establishments in Hungary